The Trevallyn Power Station is a run-of-the-river hydroelectric power station located in the northern Midlands region of Tasmania, Australia. The power station is situated on the Great Lake and South Esk catchment and is owned and operated by Hydro Tasmania.

Technical details
Part of the Great Lake and South Esk scheme that comprises three hydroelectric power stations, the Trevallyn Power Station is the final station and is located adjacent to the Tamar River north of Launceston, making use of daily flows down the South Esk River. A dam on the South Esk River diverts water through a -long penstock pipeline to the power station. Water flows underground for its entirety except for a short, -long, portion that leaves the ground near Pitt Avenue due to a valley intersecting the tunnel's course. The pipeline splits underground into four smaller pipes immediately before entry into the station's turbines. Trevallyn and Poatina are the only hydroelectric power stations currently located in the drainage basin of the South Esk River. The tunnel through which the pipeline runs is cut through dolerite and was excavated by a French tunnelling company. The bay that the used water is discharged into was excavated using mostly steam driven equipment and tram ways with the two tailing mounds now forming the Tailrace Park (south side) and the Tailrace Convention Center (north side). The Tailrace Bay has been adapted to serve recreational purposed and also provides a safe anchorage for yachts.

The power station was commissioned in 1955 by the Hydro Electric Corporation (TAS), replacing the Duck Reach Power Station. Within the station building, each turbine has a fully embedded spiral casing. A main inlet valve is located in the station immediately upstream of each turbine for maintenance and security purposes. No. 1 and no. 2 machines are equipped with a turbine relief (bypass) valve to reduce pressure rise in the turbine and penstock during rapid guide vane closure. The station output, estimated to be  annually, is fed to TasNetworks' transmission grid via two three-phase Alstom generator transformers and two 3-phase English Electric generator transformers to the outdoor switchyard.

Water is discharged into the Tamar River at sea level by an open tailrace channel.

The construction village, named Marrawaylee, is now part of the suburb of West Riverside and is accessed by Pomona Road. The power station and the open land for the transmission lines now serves as a border between the Launceston suburbs of Riverside and Trevallyn.

See also

List of power stations in Tasmania

References

External links
Hydro Tasmania page on the Trevallyn Power Development

Energy infrastructure completed in 1955
Hydroelectric power stations in Tasmania
Buildings and structures in Launceston, Tasmania
Tamar River
1955 establishments in Australia